The first cabinet of Titu Maiorescu was the government of Romania from 28 March to 14 October 1912.

Ministers
The ministers of the cabinet were as follows:

President of the Council of Ministers:
Titu Maiorescu (28 March - 14 October 1912)
Minister of the Interior: 
Constantin C. Arion (28 March - 14 October 1912)
Minister of Foreign Affairs: 
Titu Maiorescu (28 March - 14 October 1912)
Minister of Finance:
Theodor Rosetti (28 March - 14 October 1912)
Minister of Justice:
Mihail G. Cantacuzino (28 March - 14 October 1912)
Minister of War:
Gen. Ion Argetoianu (28 March - 14 October 1912)
Minister of Religious Affairs and Public Instruction:
(interim) Constantin C. Arion (28 March - 14 October 1912)
Minister of Industry and Commerce:
Dimitrie Nenițescu (28 March - 14 October 1912)
Minister of Agriculture and Property:
Ion Lahovari (28 March - 14 October 1912)
Minister of Public Works:
Ermil Pangrati (28 March - 14 October 1912)

References

Cabinets of Romania
Cabinets established in 1912
Cabinets disestablished in 1912
1912 establishments in Romania
1912 disestablishments in Romania